Shubra Khit (from ) is a village in Beheira Governorate in Egypt, which is famous for being the place of the "Battle of Shubra Khit" between the army of Napoleon Bonaparte and the Mamluk cavalry under Murad Bey on July 13, 1798.

Shubra Khit had a population of 28,505 in the 2017 census.

References

Populated places in Beheira Governorate